LP is a 2006 album by American singer-songwriter Landon Pigg.

Track listing
 All Songs Written By Landon Pigg, except "Perfectionist" (Magness/Pigg).
 "Can't Let Go"–3:58
 "Last Stop"–3:37
 "Just Like I Am"–3:16
 "Eggshells"–3:44
 "Keep Looking Up"–4:09
 "Trickery"–4:05
 "Magnetism"–3:21
 "Sailed On"–4:19
 "Great Companion"–4:15
 "Perfectionist"–4:18
 "Tin Man"–3:47
 "On the Other Side"–3:41

Album credits
 Clif Magness: Bass, Piano, Guitar (Electric), Programming, Engineer, Producer, Keyboards
 Gary Pigg: Vocals (Background), Whistle (Human)
 Tim Roberts: Mixing Assistant
 Patrick Warren: Synthesizer, Tack Piano, Wurlitzer, Chamberlain
 Serban Ghenea: Mixing
 Joey Waronker: Drums
 Landon Pigg: Guitar (Acoustic), Guitar, Guitar (Electric), Piano, Vocals
 Dan Brodbeck: Bass, Guitar (Electric), engineer, producer, Keyboards
 Corey Thompson: Drums
 Ryan Truso: Guitar, Bass
 Gabe Pigg: Vocals (Background)
 Grant Taylor: Drums
 Abe Laboriel Jr.: Drums
 Scott Hardin: Engineer
 Stephen Ferrera: A&R
 Matt Chamberlain: Drums
 Paul Ebersold: Guitar, Keyboards, Engineer, Producer

2006 albums
Landon Pigg albums
RCA Records albums